Brittlewood is a common name for several plants and may refer to:

 Claoxylon australe, native to Australia
 Nuxia congesta, native to Africa